The federal government of Switzerland may refer to:

 the Swiss Federal Council or
 the federal administration of Switzerland.